This is the list of 2013 Malaysia Super League goalscorers.

Goals 

16 goals
Marlon Alex James (ATM FA)

14 goals
Patrick Ronaldinho Wleh (PKNS FC)

10 goals
Francis Forkey Doe (Selangor FA)

9 goals
Paulo Rangel (Perak FA)

8 goals

Shahril Ishak (LionsXII)
Mohd Fauzi Roslan (Pahang FA)
Mohd Amri Yahyah (Selangor FA)

7 goals

Norshahrul Idlan Talaha (Johor Darul Takzim)

6 goals

Daniel Güiza (Johor Darul Takzim)
Indra Putra Mahayuddin (Kelantan FA)
Mohd Nor Farhan Muhammad (Kelantan FA)
Mohd Badhri Mohd Radzi (Kelantan FA)
Jean-Emmanuel Effa Owona (Terengganu FA)

5 goals

Mohd Nurul Azwan Roya (Johor Darul Takzim)
Keita Mandjou (Kelantan FA)
Fazrul Nawaz (LionsXII)
Shahfiq Ghani (LionsXII)
R. Gopinathan (Pahang FA)
Damir Ibrić (T-Team FC)

4 goals

D. Christie Jayaseelan (ATM FA)
Hairuddin Omar (ATM FA)
Muhammad Shukor Adan (ATM FA)
Leonel Núñez (Johor Darul Takzim)
Safuwan Baharudin (LionsXII)
Mohd Hafiz Kamal (Pahang FA)
Mohd Faizol Hussien (Pahang FA)
Mohd Fauzan Dzulkifli (PKNS FC)
Mohd Nizad Ayub (PKNS FC)
Mohd Ashaari Shamsuddin (Terengganu FA)
Abdul Latiff Suhaimi (T-Team FC)

3 goals

Rudie Ramli (FELDA United FC)
Dickson Nwakaeme (Kelantan FA)
Matías Conti (Pahang FA)
Mohd Razman Roslan (Pahang FA)
R. Surendran (Pahang FA)
Abdul Hadi Yahya (Perak FA)
Azlan Ismail (Perak FA)
Roman Chmelo (PKNS FC)
Mohd Raimi Mohd Nor (Selangor FA)
S. Kunanlan (Selangor FA)
Abdul Manaf Mamat (Terengganu FA)
Khairul Ramadhan Zauwawi (Terengganu FA)

2 goals

Bruno Martelotto (ATM FA)
Mohd Safee Mohd Sali (Johor Darul Takzim)
Mohammed Ghaddar (FELDA United FC)
Razali Umar Kandasamy (FELDA United FC)
Mohd Faiz Subri (Kelantan FA)
Baihakki Khaizan (LionsXII)
Hariss Harun (LionsXII)
Rashid Mahmud (Negeri Sembilan FA)
Mohd Nazrin Mohd Nawi (Negeri Sembilan FA)
Shahurain Abu Samah (Negeri Sembilan FA)
Mohd Helmi Remeli (PKNS FC)
Mohd Nazrin Syamsul Bahri (PKNS FC)
K. Gurusamy (Selangor FA)
Ismail Faruqi Asha'ri (Terengganu FA)
Mohd Fakhrurazi Musa (Terengganu FA)
Mohd Farderin Kadir (Terengganu FA)
Badrul Hisyam Morris (T-Team FC)
George Boateng (T-Team FC)

1 goals

Amirizwan Taj Tajuddin (ATM FA)
Irwan Fadzli Idrus (ATM FA)
Norfazly Alias (ATM FA)
Rezal Zambery Yahya (ATM FA)
Venice Elphi (ATM FA)
Ahmad Ezrie Shafizie Sazali (Johor Darul Takzim)
Jasazrin Jamaluddin (Johor Darul Takzim)
Kamarul Afiq Kamaruddin (Johor Darul Takzim)
Mohd Aidil Zafuan Abdul Radzak (Johor Darul Takzim)
Mohd Safiq Rahim (Johor Darul Takzim)
Simone Del Nero (Johor Darul Takzim)
Azmizi Azmi (FELDA United FC)
Júnior Pereira (FELDA United FC)
Leonel Saint-Preux (FELDA United FC)
Mohd Khairul Anuar Jamil (FELDA United FC)
Mohd Riduwan Ma'on (FELDA United FC)
Ahmad Fakri Saarani (Kelantan FA)
Mohd Zamri Ramli (Kelantan FA)
Zairo Anuar Zalani (Kelantan FA)
Zairul Fitree Ishak (Kelantan FA)
Faris Ramli (LionsXII)
Khairul Nizam (LionsXII)
Nazrul Nazari (LionsXII)
Shakir Hamzah (LionsXII)
Syafiq Zainal (LionsXII)
Eddy Helmi Abdul Manan (Negeri Sembilan FA)
Fabio Leandro Barbosa (Negeri Sembilan FA)
Mohd Fauzi Nan (Negeri Sembilan FA)
Mohd Firdaus Azizul (Negeri Sembilan FA)
Mohd Rahizi Rasib (Negeri Sembilan FA)
Abdul Malik Mat Ariff (Pahang FA)
Damion Stewart (Pahang FA)
Mohd Amirul Hadi Zainal (Pahang FA)
Mohd Azamuddin Md Akil (Pahang FA)
Mohamed Borji (Pahang FA)
Mohd Azrul Ahmad (Perak FA)
Karim Rouani (Perak FA)
Mohd Failee Mohamad Ghazli (Perak FA)
Muhd Rafiuddin Rodin (Perak FA)
Muhd Shahrom Abdul Kalam (Perak FA)
Noor Hazrul Mustafa (Perak FA)
Mohamad Fazli Baharudin (PKNS FC)
Mohd Faiz Mohd Isa (PKNS FC)
Muhd Fakhrul Aiman Sidid (PKNS FC)
Muhd Khairu Azrin Khazali (PKNS FC)
Nazmi Faiz (PKNS FC)
Zamri Morshidi (PKNS FC)
Adam Griffiths (Selangor FA)
Mahali Jasuli (Selangor FA)
Mohd Nasriq Baharom (Selangor FA)
Mohd Ramzul Zahini Adnan (Selangor FA)
Ramez Dayoub (Selangor FA)
G. Puaneswaran (Terengganu FA)
Mohd Faizal Muhammad (Terengganu FA)
Mohd Nasril Izzat Jalil (Terengganu FA)
Ahmad Syamim Yahaya (T-Team FC)
Ahmad Takhiyuddin Roslan (T-Team FC)
Azrul Hazran Amiludin (T-Team FC)
Mohd Aizulridzwan Razali (T-Team FC)
Mohd Muinuddin Mokhtar (T-Team FC)
Mohd Syuhiran Zainal (T-Team FC)

Own goal

1 goal
Mohd Nuraliff Zainal Abidin (T-Team FC) (for Perak FA)
Jalaluddin Jaafar (Pahang FA) (for Perak FA)
Hasmizan Kamarodin (Terengganu FA) (for LionsXII)
P. Gunalan (PKNS FC) (for Darul Takzim FC)
Mohd Azrul Ahmad (FELDA United FC) (for LionsXII)
Mohd Helmi Remeli (PKNS FC) (for Pahang FA)

See also
 Super League Malaysia seasons
 2013 Malaysia Super League
 Malaysia Super League

References

External links
 Official website

2013 in Malaysian football
2012 goalscorers

ms:Liga Super Malaysia 2013